
Year 242 BC was a year of the pre-Julian Roman calendar. At the time it was known as the Year of the Consulship of Catulus and Albinus (or, less frequently, year 512 Ab urbe condita). The denomination 242 BC for this year has been used since the early medieval period, when the Anno Domini calendar era became the prevalent method in Europe for naming years.

Events 
 By place 
 Roman Republic 
 The Roman consul and commander, Gaius Lutatius Catulus, blockades the Sicilian cities of Lilybaeum and Drepanum with a fleet of 200 ships.

 Egypt 
 The destruction of the Egyptian fleet by the Macedonians ends the naval supremacy of the Ptolemies but does not force them to relinquish their territories in Syria and the Aegean Sea.

 China 
 The Qin general Meng Ao annexes 20 towns and cities from the State of Wei, conquering the cities of Suanzao, Yan, Xu, Changping, Yongqiu and Shanyang. He then establishes the Dongjun Commandery.
 The Zhao general Pang Nuan defeats the army of the State of Yan and kills its general Chu Xin.

Births

Deaths 
 Maharani Devi, Mauryan empress and wife of Ashoka (approximate date)

References